The Gregg House is a historic house at 412 Pine Street in Newport, Arkansas.  It is a two-story brick-faced structure, three bays wide, with a side gable roof, twin interior chimneys, and a two-story addition projecting to the right.  The front facade bays are filled with paired sash windows, except for the entrance at the center, which is sheltered by a gable-roofed portico supported by box columns.  The entrance is flanked by sidelight windows and topped by a lintel decorated with rosettes.  The house was designed by Sanders and Ginocchio and built in 1920, and is a fine local example of Colonial Revival architecture.

The house was listed on the National Register of Historic Places in 1982.

See also
National Register of Historic Places listings in Jackson County, Arkansas

References

Houses on the National Register of Historic Places in Arkansas
Colonial Revival architecture in Arkansas
Houses completed in 1920
Houses in Jackson County, Arkansas
National Register of Historic Places in Jackson County, Arkansas
Newport, Arkansas